Scott W. Craig is an American politician and was a Republican member of the South Dakota House of Representatives representing District 33 from January 11, 2013 to 2017. He is the pastor of Landmark Community Church.

Elections
2012 When incumbent Republican Representative Phil Jensen ran for South Dakota Senate and left a District 33 seat open, Craig ran in the June 5, 2012 Republican Primary; in the three-way November 6, 2012 General election, incumbent Republican Representative Jacqueline Sly took the first seat and Craig took the second seat with 4,905 votes (33.62%) ahead of Democratic nominee Robin Page.

References

External links
Official page at the South Dakota Legislature
 

Place of birth missing (living people)
Living people
American clergy
Republican Party members of the South Dakota House of Representatives
Politicians from Rapid City, South Dakota
1964 births
21st-century American politicians